Andreas Dresen (born 16 August 1963) is a German film director. His directing credits include Cloud 9, Summer in Berlin, Grill Point and Night Shapes. His film Stopped on Track premiered at the Un Certain Regard section at the 2011 Cannes Film Festival, where it won the Prize of Un Certain Regard. Dresen is known for his realistic style, which gives his films a semi-documentary feel. He works very teamoriented and heavily uses improvisation. In 2013 he was a member of the jury at the 63rd Berlin International Film Festival.

Early life and education 

Dresen was born in Gera.
From 1984-85 Dresen worked as a sound engineer for the Schwerin Theatre. From 1984-1986 he was a trainee at East Germany's DEFA Studio for Feature Films as an assistant director to Günter Reisch. Between 1989-91 he studied directing at the Konrad Wolf College of Film and Television in Potsdam-Babelsberg and was a Master student in Günter Reisch's class at the Berlin Art Academy.

Career

Starting in 1985, Dresen directed several short films, documentaries, and films for television, and wrote screenplays.

Filmography
 1990:  (TV film) — (based on a story by Jurek Becker)
 1992: 
 1994: Mein unbekannter Ehemann (TV film)
 1994: Das andere Leben des Herrn Kreins (TV film) — (based on the play The Professional by Dušan Kovačević)
 1996: Polizeiruf 110: Der Tausch (TV series episode)
 1997:  (TV film)
 1999: Nightshapes 
 2000:  (TV film) — (based on a novel by )
 2002: Grill Point (Halbe Treppe)
 2005:  — (based on a novel by Christoph Hein)
 2005: Summer in Berlin — (screenplay by Wolfgang Kohlhaase)
 2008: Cloud 9
 2009:  — (screenplay by Wolfgang Kohlhaase)
 2011: Stopped on Track 
 2015: As We Were Dreaming — (based on a novel by Clemens Meyer)
 2017:  — (based on the novel Timm Thaler by James Krüss)
 2018: Gundermann
 2022: Rabiye Kurnaz vs. George W. Bush
Documentaries
 1989: Jenseits von Klein Wanzleben
 1994: Kuckuckskinder
 2003:  – 
 2010: 20 x Brandenburg (TV)
 2012: Herr Wichmann aus der dritten Reihe

Awards

German Awards 
 German Film Critics Association Awards
o 1999: Best feature film for Night Shapes
o 2003: Best feature film for Grill Point
 Bavarian Film Award
o 2003: Director's Award for Grill Point
o 2006: Director's Award for Summer in Berlin

 Hessian Film Award
o 1992: for Stilles Land

 Grimme-Award
o 2001: Adolf-Grimme-Award in Gold for Policewoman
o 2011: Grimme-Award, Section Information and Kultur, for the artistic direction of 20 x Brandenburg

 Fernsehfilm-Festival Baden-Baden
o 2000: Hauptpreis für Policewoman

 German Film Award
o 1999: Nominated for the Film Award in Gold for Extraordinary Achievements in Directing for Night Shapes 
o 2002: Film Award in Silber for Grill Point
o 2002: Nominated for the Film Award for Extraordinary Achievements in Directing for Grill Point
o 2009: Best Director for Cloud 9

 German Television Award
o 2001: Award for best Director for Policewoman

 Internationales Filmfest Emden Aurich Norderney
o 1999: Nominated for the Film Award for Night Shapes

 1992: German Film Critics Award

 2007: Order of Merit of the Federal Republic of Germany

 2011: Douglas-Sirk-Award of the Filmfest Hamburg

International Awards 
 International Children's and Youth Filmfestival
o 1998: Lucas for the age group 12- and 13 for Raus aus der Haut

 Max-Ophüls-Award
o 1995: Sponsorship Award for Feature Film for Mein unbekannter Ehemann

 International Filmfestival Berlin
o 1999: Nominated for the Golden Bear for Night Shapes
o 2002: Silver Bear of the jury for Grill Point

 Montréal Film Festival
o 2000: Nominated for the Grand Prix for Policewoman

 International Filmfestival Flandern
o 2002: Silver Spur for Grill Point

 Chicago International Film Festival
o 2002: Silver Hugo – Best Director for Grill Point

 European Film Award
o 2002: Nominated for Best Director for Grill Point
o 2008: Nominated for Best Director for Cloud 9

 International Film Festival of Cannes
o 2008: Coup de coeur du jury for Grill Point
o 2011: Prix Un Certain Regard for Stopped on Track

 International Filmfestival Karlovy Vary
o 2009: Best Director for Whiskey with Vodka

References

External links

 
 Interview with Andreas Dresen by Ulrich Bach & Enrique Gonzales-Conti 

1963 births
Living people
People from Gera
Film directors from Thuringia
Members of the Academy of Arts, Berlin
Best Director German Film Award winners
Recipients of the Cross of the Order of Merit of the Federal Republic of Germany